Llandudno Junction, once known as Tremarl, is a village in Conwy County Borough, Wales. It is part of the ancient parish of Llangystennin, and it is located south of Llandudno.  It adjoins Deganwy and is to the east of the walled town of Conwy, which is on the opposite side of the River Conwy. The population is 6,722 (2011) and is part of the community of Conwy, and comprises the wards of Marl and Pensarn (Llandudno Junction). The built-up area of Llandudno Junction and Deganwy had a population of 10,658.

The village grew up around Llandudno Junction railway station, which is a junction between the Crewe-Holyhead line and the Llandudno-Blaenau Ffestiniog line. There are through trains from Manchester to Llandudno, but passengers travelling from London, Cardiff, or Holyhead to Llandudno usually have to change trains at Llandudno Junction.

Llandudno Junction, in addition to its passenger interchange, had a major steam locomotive servicing depot and extensive goods facilities. This railway depot was called 6G, and a new section of the A546 (carrying the name "Ffordd 6G Road") now crosses the site. The site of the depot and goods yard has been redeveloped, now accommodating a business park, fast food outlets, a leisure centre, a Cineworld multiplex cinema, and a Tesco supermarket. Llandudno Junction has recently added a Lidl store, too.

Local employment opportunities changed significantly in the latter quarter of the 20th century owing to the loss not only of the railway depots but also of a major electrical manufacturing facility (Hotpoint), of which part of the old factory site is under planning application for three more Car Dealerships.

Another part of the factory site was bought by the Welsh Government and construction began in 2007 on a new office building that houses around 525 employees, including about 100 tourism, transport and enterprise jobs which were relocated from Cardiff. The keys to the building were officially handed over from the developers in May 2010.

The Old Station Hotel stands opposite the railway station. It is known locally as 'The Killer' or in Welsh 'Y Killer'. One version of the myth on how it got its name is that train drivers would get drunk there, then drive trains, effectively turning them into possible 'Killers'. Another version states that this is where the railway workers would spend their lunch breaks, i.e. 'killed time'.

In September 2016, the two primary schools in Llandudno Junction, Ysgol Maelgwn and Ysgol Nant-y-Coed, amalgamated to form a new school, Ysgol Awel y Mynydd.

Llandudno Junction F.C. are the local football team. The village was previously home to Welsh Cup winners Borough United F.C.

References

External links

Towns in Conwy County Borough
Conwy
Populated coastal places in Wales